Furan may refer to:

Furan, the chemical industrial compound
Polychlorinated dibenzofurans, an unintentional contaminant byproduct of furans
Furan (river) in France
Furan, Iran, a village in Markazi Province, Iran
Nitrofurantoin, by the trade name Furan